Broginin is a hamlet in the community of Trefeurig, Ceredigion, Wales, which is 74.6 miles (120 km) from Cardiff and 175.7 miles (282.8 km) from London. Broginin is represented in the Senedd by Elin Jones (Plaid Cymru) and is part of the Ceredigion constituency in the House of Commons.

See also 
 List of localities in Wales by population

References

External links 
 Archaeology in Wales

Villages in Ceredigion